The 2012 Tameside Council election took place on 3 May 2012 to elect members of Tameside Metropolitan Borough Council in England. This was on the same day as other 2012 United Kingdom local elections.

One third of the council was up for election, with councillors elected in 2008 Tameside Council election defending their seats with vote share changes calculated on that basis.

Results
An asterisk denotes an incumbent.

Ashton Hurst ward

Ashton St. Michael's ward

Ashton Waterloo ward

Audenshaw ward

Denton North East ward

Denton South ward

Denton West ward

Droylsden East ward

Droylsden West ward

Dukinfield ward
In 2008, Roy West stood in this ward as a British National Party candidate.

Dukinfield / Stalybridge ward
The previous councillor for Dukinfield / Stalybridge, Dorothy Cartwright, defected from the Conservative Party to the Labour Party in December 2010.

Hyde Godley ward

Hyde Newton ward

Hyde Werneth ward

Longdendale ward

Mossley ward

St. Peters ward

Stalybridge North ward

Stalybridge South ward

References

2012 English local elections
2012
2010s in Greater Manchester